This is a list of hospitals in Barbados.

Bayview Hospital - Bayville, Saint Michael
Queen Elizabeth Hospital (QEH) - Bridgetown
The Sparman Clinic - Belleville, Saint Michael
The Premiere Surgical Centre- Belleville, Saint Michael

See also
List of medical schools in the Caribbean

 
Hospitals
B
Barbados